Pryagayevo is a rural locality (a village) in Nikolskoye Rural Settlement, Kaduysky District, Vologda Oblast, Russia. The population was 2 as of 2002.

Geography 
Pryagayevo is located 27 km north of Kaduy (the district's administrative centre) by road. Vasilyevskaya is the nearest rural locality.

References 

Rural localities in Kaduysky District